The 2022–23 ICC Men's T20 World Cup East Asia-Pacific Qualifier is a cricket tournament that forms part of the qualification process for the 2024 ICC Men's T20 World Cup. The first stage of the qualification pathway in the East Asia-Pacific (EAP) region consisted of two sub-regional qualifiers: Qualifier A in Vanuatu in September 2022, and Qualifier B in Japan in October 2022. The winner of each of the sub-regional qualifiers progressed to the EAP regional final, to be played in 2023, where they were joined by Philippines and Papua New Guinea. The winner of the Regional Final will qualify for the 2024 T20 World Cup in the West Indies and the United States.

The Cook Islands and Fiji both played their first official T20I matches during Qualifier A. Vanuatu finished top of Qualifier A with five wins out of six, and advanced to the regional final. Cook Islands captain Ma'ara Ave was named as player of the tournament, after top-scoring with 290 runs at an average of 72.50. Japan progressed from Qualifier B after finishing above Indonesia on net run rate. Japan's Lachlan Yamamoto-Lake was named as the player of the tournament.

Teams

Qualifier A

Squads

Sean Solia was originally announced as captain of the Samoan squad, but was later named in the New Zealand A squad for their tour of India. The Cook Islands squad consisted of seven players based in the islands and seven players based in Auckland. The squad convened in Auckland to play three practice matches against an Auckland Māori side in preparation for the qualifier. Before the start of the tournament, Samoa's Benjamin Mailata also withdrew from the squad.

Points table

 Advanced to the regional final

Fixtures

Qualifier B

Squads

Wataru Miyauchi replaced Ryan Drake in Japan's squad before the start of the tournament.

Points table

 Advanced to the regional final

Fixtures

Regional Final

 Advance to the 2024 ICC Men's T20 World Cup

References

External links
 Series home at ESPNcricinfo (Qualifier A)
 Series home at ESPNcricinfo (Qualifier B)

ICC Men's T20 World Cup Qualifier
Qualifiers
Associate international cricket competitions in 2022–23
Associate international cricket competitions in 2023
ICC Men's T20 World Cup East Asia-Pacific Qualifier
ICC Men's T20 World Cup East Asia-Pacific Qualifier